Sodium hypochlorite, commonly known in a dilute solution as (chlorine) bleach, is an inorganic chemical compound with the formula NaOCl (or NaClO), comprising a sodium cation and a hypochlorite anion (or ). It may also be viewed as the sodium salt of hypochlorous acid. The anhydrous compound is unstable and may decompose explosively. It can be crystallized as a pentahydrate ·5, a pale greenish-yellow solid which is not explosive and is stable if kept refrigerated.

Sodium hypochlorite is most often encountered as a pale greenish-yellow dilute solution referred to as liquid bleach, which is a household chemical widely used (since the 18th century) as a disinfectant or a bleaching agent. In solution, the compound is unstable and easily decomposes, liberating chlorine, which is the active principle of such products. Sodium hypochlorite is the oldest and still most important chlorine-based bleach. 

Its corrosive properties, common availability, and reaction products make it a significant safety risk. In particular, mixing liquid bleach with other cleaning products, such as acids found in limescale-removing products, will produce chlorine gas, which was used as a chemical weapon in World War I. A common urban legend states that mixing bleach with ammonia also releases chlorine, but in reality the two chemicals react differently, producing chloramines and/or nitrogen trichloride. With excess ammonia and sodium hydroxide, hydrazine may be generated.

Chemistry

Stability of the solid 
Anhydrous sodium hypochlorite can be prepared but, like many hypochlorites, it is highly unstable and decomposes explosively on heating or friction. The decomposition is accelerated by carbon dioxide at atmospheric levels. It is a white solid with the orthorhombic crystal structure.

Sodium hypochlorite can also be obtained as a crystalline pentahydrate ·5, which is not explosive and is much more stable than the anhydrous compound. The formula is sometimes given as 2·10.. The Cl–O bond length in the pentahydrate is 1.686 Å. The transparent, light greenish-yellow, orthorhombic crystals contain 44% NaOCl by weight and melt at 25–27 °C. The compound decomposes rapidly at room temperature, so it must be kept under refrigeration. At lower temperatures, however, it is quite stable: reportedly only 1% decomposition after 360 days at 7 °C.

A 1966 US patent claims that stable solid sodium hypochlorite dihydrate ·2 can be obtained by carefully excluding chloride ions, which are present in the output of common manufacturing processes and are said to catalyze the decomposition of hypochlorite into chlorate and chloride. In one test, the dihydrate was claimed to show only 6% decomposition after 13.5 months storage at −25 °C. The patent also claims that the dihydrate can be reduced to the anhydrous form by vacuum drying at about 50 °C, yielding a solid that showed no decomposition after 64 hours at −25 °C.

Equilibria and stability of solutions 
At typical ambient temperatures, sodium hypochlorite is more stable in dilute solutions that contain solvated  and  ions. The density of the solution is 1.093 g/mL at 5% concentration, and 1.21 g/mL at 14%, 20 °C. Stoichiometric solutions are fairly alkaline, with pH 11 or higher since hypochlorous acid is a weak acid:

 +   HOCl + 

The following species and equilibria are present in solutions of :

  (aq) ⇌  + 
  (aq) +  +  ⇌  (aq) + 
  (aq) +  ⇌ 
  (aq) ⇌  (g)

The second equilibrium equation above will be shifted to the right if the chlorine  is allowed to escape as gas. At pH below 2, the majority of the chlorine in the solution is in the form of dissolved elemental . At pH greater than 7.4, the majority is in the form of hypochlorite . The equilibrium can be shifted by adding acids (such as hydrochloric acid) or bases (such as sodium hydroxide) to the solution:

 (aq)  + 2 HCl (aq) →  (g) +  (aq) +  (aq)
 (g) + 2  →  (aq) +  (aq) +  (aq)

At a pH of about 4, such as obtained by the addition of strong acids like hydrochloric acid, the amount of undissociated (nonionized) HOCl is highest. The reaction can be written as:

 +  ⇌ HClO

Sodium hypochlorite solutions combined with acid evolve chlorine gas, particularly strongly at pH < 2, by the reactions:

  (aq) +  +  ⇌  (aq) + 
  (aq) ⇌  (g)

At pH > 8, the chlorine is practically all in the form of hypochlorite anions. The solutions are fairly stable at pH 11–12. Even so, one report claims that a conventional 13.6% NaOCl reagent solution lost 17% of its strength after being stored for 360 days at 7 °C. For this reason, in some applications one may use more stable chlorine-releasing compounds, such as calcium hypochlorite  or trichloroisocyanuric acid .

Anhydrous sodium hypochlorite is soluble in methanol, and solutions are stable.

Decomposition to chlorate or oxygen 
In solution, under certain conditions, the hypochlorite anion may also disproportionate (autoxidize) to chloride and chlorate:
3  +  →  + 2 

In particular, this reaction occurs in sodium hypochlorite solutions at high temperatures, forming sodium chlorate and sodium chloride:
3  (aq) → 2  (aq) +  (aq)
This reaction is exploited in the industrial production of sodium chlorate.

An alternative decomposition of hypochlorite produces oxygen instead: 
2  → 2  + 
In hot sodium hypochlorite solutions, this reaction competes with chlorate formation, yielding sodium chloride and oxygen gas:
2  (aq) → 2  (aq) +  (g)

These two decomposition reactions of  solutions are maximized at pH around 6. The chlorate-producing reaction predominates at pH above 6, while the oxygen one becomes significant below that. For example, at 80 °C, with NaOCl and NaCl concentrations of 80 mM, and pH 6–6.5, the chlorate is produced with ∼95% efficiency. The oxygen pathway predominates at pH 10. This decomposition is affected by light and metal ion catalysts such as copper, nickel, cobalt, and iridium. Catalysts like sodium dichromate  and sodium molybdate  may be added industrially to reduce the oxygen pathway, but a report claims that only the latter is effective.

Titration
Titration of hypochlorite solutions is often done by adding a measured sample to an excess amount of acidified solution of potassium iodide and then titrating the liberated iodine with a standard solution of sodium thiosulfate or phenylarsine oxide, using starch as indicator, until the blue color disappears.

According to one US patent, the stability of sodium hypochlorite content of solids or solutions can be determined by monitoring the infrared absorption due to the O–Cl bond. The characteristic wavelength is given as 140.25 μm for water solutions, 140.05 μm for the solid dihydrate NaOCl·2, and 139.08 μm for the anhydrous mixed salt .

Oxidation of organic compounds
Oxidation of starch by sodium hypochlorite, that adds carbonyl and carboxyl groups, is relevant to the production of modified starch products.

In the presence of a phase-transfer catalyst, alcohols are oxidized to the corresponding carbonyl compound (aldehyde or ketone). Sodium hypochlorite can also oxidize organic sulfides to sulfoxides or sulfones, disulfides or thiols to sulfonyl halides, imines to oxaziridines. It can also de-aromatize phenols.

Oxidation of metals and complexes 
Heterogeneous reactions of sodium hypochlorite and metals such as zinc proceed slowly to give the metal oxide or hydroxide:
NaOCl + Zn → ZnO + NaCl

Homogeneous reactions with metal coordination complexes proceed somewhat faster. This has been exploited in the Jacobsen epoxidation.

Other reactions

If not properly stored in airtight containers, sodium hypochlorite reacts with carbon dioxide to form sodium carbonate:

2 NaOCl  +  +  →   + 2 HOCl

Sodium hypochlorite reacts with most nitrogen compounds to form volatile monochloramine, dichloramines, and nitrogen trichloride:
 + NaOCl →  + NaOH
 + NaOCl →  + NaOH
 + NaOCl →  + NaOH

Neutralization
Sodium thiosulfate is an effective chlorine neutralizer. Rinsing with a 5 mg/L solution, followed by washing with soap and water, will remove chlorine odor from the hands.

Production

Chlorination of soda
Potassium hypochlorite was first produced in 1789 by Claude Louis Berthollet in his laboratory on the Quai de Javel in Paris, France, by passing chlorine gas through a solution of potash lye. The resulting liquid, known as "Eau de Javel" ("Javel water"), was a weak solution of potassium hypochlorite. Antoine Labarraque replaced potash lye by the cheaper soda lye, thus obtaining sodium hypochlorite (Eau de Labarraque). 
Cl2 (g) + 2 NaOH (aq) → NaCl (aq) + NaClO (aq) + H2O (aq)

Hence, chlorine is simultaneously reduced and oxidized; this process is known as disproportionation.

The process is also used to prepare the pentahydrate ·5 for industrial and laboratory use. In a typical process, chlorine gas is added to a 45–48% NaOH solution. Some of the sodium chloride precipitates and is removed by filtration, and the pentahydrate is then obtained by cooling the filtrate to 12 °C .

From calcium hypochlorite
Another method involved the reaction of sodium carbonate ("washing soda") with chlorinated lime ("bleaching powder"), a mixture of calcium hypochlorite , calcium chloride , and calcium hydroxide :
  (aq) +  (aq) →   (s) + 2  (aq)
  (aq) +  (aq) →   (s) + 2  (aq)
  (aq) +  (s) →   (s) + 2  (aq)
This method was commonly used to produce hypochlorite solutions for use as a hospital antiseptic that was sold after World War I under the names "Eusol", an abbreviation for Edinburgh University Solution Of (chlorinated) Lime – a reference to the university's pathology department, where it was developed.

Electrolysis of brine
Near the end of the nineteenth century, E. S. Smith patented the chloralkali process: a method of producing sodium hypochlorite involving the electrolysis of brine to produce sodium hydroxide and chlorine gas, which then mixed to form sodium hypochlorite. The key reactions are:
2 Cl− → Cl2 + 2 e− (at the anode)
2  +  2 e− →  + 2  (at the cathode)
Both electric power and brine solution were in cheap supply at the time, and various enterprising marketers took advantage of the situation to satisfy the market's demand for sodium hypochlorite. Bottled solutions of sodium hypochlorite were sold under numerous trade names.

Today, an improved version of this method, known as the Hooker process (named after Hooker Chemicals, acquired by Occidental Petroleum), is the only large-scale industrial method of sodium hypochlorite production. In the process, sodium hypochlorite (NaClO) and sodium chloride (NaCl) are formed when chlorine is passed into cold dilute sodium hydroxide solution. The chlorine is prepared industrially by electrolysis with minimal separation between the anode and the cathode. The solution must be kept below 40 °C (by cooling coils) to prevent the undesired formation of sodium chlorate.

Commercial solutions always contain significant amounts of sodium chloride (common salt) as the main by-product, as seen in the equation above.

From hypochlorous acid and soda
A 1966 patent describes the production of solid stable dihydrate ·2 by reacting a chloride-free solution of hypochlorous acid  (such as prepared from chlorine monoxide  and water), with a concentrated solution of sodium hydroxide. In a typical preparation, 255 mL of a solution with 118 g/L  is slowly added with stirring to a solution of 40 g of NaOH in water 0 °C. Some sodium chloride precipitates and is removed by filtration. The solution is vacuum evaporated at 40–50 °C and 1–2 mmHg until the dihydrate crystallizes out. The crystals are vacuum-dried to produce a free-flowing crystalline powder.

The same principle was used in a 1993 patent to produce concentrated slurries of the pentahydrate NaClO·5. Typically, a 35% solution (by weight) of HClO is combined with sodium hydroxide at about or below 25 °C. The resulting slurry contains about 35% NaClO, and are relatively stable due to the low concentration of chloride.

From ozone and salt

Sodium hypochlorite can be easily produced for research purposes by reacting ozone with salt.

NaCl + O3 → NaClO + O2

This reaction happens at room temperature and can be helpful for oxidizing alcohols.

Packaging and sale 

Household bleach sold for use in laundering clothes is a 3–8% solution of sodium hypochlorite at the time of manufacture. Strength varies from one formulation to another and gradually decreases with long storage. Sodium hydroxide is usually added in small amounts to household bleach to slow down the decomposition of NaClO.

Domestic use patio blackspot remover products are ~10% solutions of sodium hypochlorite.

A 10–25% solution of sodium hypochlorite is, according to Univar's safety sheet, supplied with synonyms or trade names bleach, Hypo, Everchlor, Chloros, Hispec, Bridos, Bleacol, or Vo-redox 9110.

A 12% solution is widely used in waterworks for the chlorination of water, and a 15% solution is more commonly used for disinfection of waste water in treatment plants. Sodium hypochlorite can also be used for point-of-use disinfection of drinking water, taking 0.2-2 mg of sodium hypochlorite per liter of water.

Dilute solutions (50 ppm to 1.5%) are found in disinfecting sprays and wipes used on hard surfaces.

Uses

Bleaching 
Household bleach is, in general, a solution containing 3–8% sodium hypochlorite, by weight, and 0.01–0.05% sodium hydroxide; the sodium hydroxide is used to slow the decomposition of sodium hypochlorite into sodium chloride and sodium chlorate.

Cleaning 
Sodium hypochlorite has destaining properties. Among other applications, it can be used to remove mold stains, dental stains caused by fluorosis, and stains on crockery, especially those caused by the tannins in tea. It has also been used in laundry detergents and as a surface cleaner. It is also used in sodium hypochlorite washes.

Its bleaching, cleaning, deodorizing and caustic effects are due to oxidation and hydrolysis (saponification). Organic dirt exposed to hypochlorite becomes water-soluble and non-volatile, which reduces its odor and facilitates its removal.

Disinfection 

Sodium hypochlorite in solution exhibits broad spectrum anti-microbial activity and is widely used in healthcare facilities in a variety of settings. It is usually diluted in water depending on its intended use. "Strong chlorine solution" is a 0.5% solution of hypochlorite (containing approximately 5000 ppm free chlorine) used for disinfecting areas contaminated with body fluids, including large blood spills (the area is first cleaned with detergent before being disinfected). It may be made by diluting household bleach as appropriate (normally 1 part bleach to 9 parts water). Such solutions have been demonstrated to inactivate both C. difficile and HPV. "Weak chlorine solution" is a 0.05% solution of hypochlorite used for washing hands, but is normally prepared with calcium hypochlorite granules.

"Dakin's Solution" is a disinfectant solution containing low concentration of sodium hypochlorite and some boric acid or sodium bicarbonate to stabilize the pH. It has been found to be effective with NaOCl concentrations as low as 0.025%.

US government regulations allow food processing equipment and food contact surfaces to be sanitized with solutions containing bleach, provided that the solution is allowed to drain adequately before contact with food, and that the solutions do not exceed 200 parts per million (ppm) available chlorine (for example, one tablespoon of typical household bleach containing 5.25% sodium hypochlorite, per gallon of water). If higher concentrations are used, the surface must be rinsed with potable water after sanitizing.

A similar concentration of bleach in warm water is used to sanitize surfaces prior to brewing of beer or wine. Surfaces must be rinsed with sterilized (boiled) water to avoid imparting flavors to the brew; the chlorinated byproducts of sanitizing surfaces are also harmful. The mode of disinfectant action of sodium hypochlorite is similar to that of hypochlorous acid.

Solutions containing more than 500 ppm available chlorine are corrosive to some metals, alloys and many thermoplastics (such as acetal resin) and need to be thoroughly removed afterwards, so the bleach disinfection is sometimes followed by an ethanol disinfection. Liquids containing sodium hypochlorite as the main active component are also used for household cleaning and disinfection, for example toilet cleaners. Some cleaners are formulated to be viscous so as not to drain quickly from vertical surfaces, such as the inside of a toilet bowl.

The undissociated (nonionized) hypochlorous acid is believed to react with and inactivate bacterial and viral enzymes.

Neutrophils of the human immune system produce small amounts of hypochlorite inside phagosomes, which digest bacteria and viruses.

Deodorizing 
Sodium hypochlorite has deodorizing properties, which go hand in hand with its cleaning properties.

Waste water treatment 
Sodium hypochlorite solutions have been used to treat dilute cyanide waste water, such as electroplating wastes. In batch treatment operations, sodium hypochlorite has been used to treat more concentrated cyanide wastes, such as silver cyanide plating solutions. Toxic cyanide is oxidized to cyanate (OCN−) that is not toxic, idealized as follows:
CN− + OCl− → OCN− + Cl−

Sodium hypochlorite is commonly used as a biocide in industrial applications to control slime and bacteria formation in water systems used at power plants, pulp and paper mills, etc., in solutions typically of 10–15% by weight.

Endodontics 
Sodium hypochlorite is the medicament of choice due to its efficacy against pathogenic organisms and pulp digestion in endodontic therapy. Its concentration for use varies from 0.5% to 5.25%. At low concentrations it dissolves mainly necrotic tissue; at higher concentrations it also dissolves vital tissue and additional bacterial species. One study has shown that Enterococcus faecalis was still present in the dentin after 40 minutes of exposure of 1.3% and 2.5% sodium hypochlorite, whereas 40 minutes at a concentration of 5.25% was effective in E. faecalis removal. In addition to higher concentrations of sodium hypochlorite, longer time exposure and warming the solution (60 °C) also increases its effectiveness in removing soft tissue and bacteria within the root canal chamber. 2% is a common concentration as there is less risk of an iatrogenic hypochlorite incident. A hypochlorite incident is an immediate reaction of severe pain, followed by edema, haematoma, and ecchymosis as a consequence of the solution escaping the confines of the tooth and entering the periapical space. This may be caused by binding or excessive pressure on the irrigant syringe, or it may occur if the tooth has an unusually large apical foramen.

Nerve agent neutralization 

At the various nerve agent (chemical warfare nerve gas) destruction facilities throughout the United States, 50% sodium hypochlorite is used to remove all traces of nerve agent or blister agent from Personal Protection Equipment after an entry is made by personnel into toxic areas. 50% sodium hypochlorite is also used to neutralize any accidental releases of the nerve agent in the toxic areas. Lesser concentrations of sodium hypochlorite are used in a similar fashion in the Pollution Abatement System to ensure that no nerve agent is released into the furnace flue gas.

Reduction of skin damage 
Dilute bleach baths have been used for decades to treat moderate to severe eczema in humans, but it has not been clear why they work. One of the reasons why bleach helps is that eczema can frequently result in secondary infections, especially from bacteria like Staphylococcus aureus, which makes managing it difficult. Staphylococcus aureus infection is related to the pathogenesis of eczema and AD. Bleach baths are one method for lowering the risk of staph infections in people with eczema.The antibacterial and anti-inflammatory properties of sodium hypochlorite contribute to the reduction of harmful bacteria on the skin and the reduction of inflammation, respectively. According to work published by researchers at the Stanford University School of Medicine in November 2013, a very dilute (0.005%) solution of sodium hypochlorite in water was successful in treating skin damage with an inflammatory component caused by radiation therapy, excess sun exposure or aging in laboratory mice. Mice with radiation dermatitis given daily 30-minute baths in bleach solution experienced less severe skin damage and better healing and hair regrowth than animals bathed in water. A molecule called nuclear factor kappa-light-chain-enhancer of activated B cells (NF-κB) is known to play a critical role in inflammation, aging, and response to radiation. The researchers found that if NF-κB activity was blocked in elderly mice by bathing them in bleach solution, the animals' skin began to look younger, going from old and fragile to thicker, with increased cell proliferation. The effect diminished after the baths were stopped, indicating that regular exposure was necessary to maintain skin thickness.

Safety 
It is estimated that there are about 3,300 accidents needing hospital treatment caused by sodium hypochlorite solutions each year in British homes (RoSPA, 2002).

Oxidation and corrosion
Sodium hypochlorite is a strong oxidizer. Oxidation reactions are corrosive. Solutions burn the skin and cause eye damage, especially when used in concentrated forms. As recognized by the NFPA, however, only solutions containing more than 40% sodium hypochlorite by weight are considered hazardous oxidizers. Solutions less than 40% are classified as a moderate oxidizing hazard (NFPA 430, 2000).

Household bleach and pool chlorinator solutions are typically stabilized by a significant concentration of lye (caustic soda, NaOH) as part of the manufacturing reaction. This additive will by itself cause caustic irritation or burns due to defatting and saponification of skin oils and destruction of tissue. The slippery feel of bleach on skin is due to this process.

Storage hazards
Contact of sodium hypochlorite solutions with metals may evolve flammable hydrogen gas. Containers may explode when heated due to release of chlorine gas.

Hypochlorite solutions are corrosive to common container materials such as stainless steel and aluminium. The few compatible metals include titanium (which however is not compatible with dry chlorine) and tantalum. Glass containers are safe. Some plastics and rubbers are affected too; safe choices include polyethylene (PE), high density polyethylene (HDPE, PE-HD), polypropylene (PP), some chlorinated and fluorinated polymers such as polyvinyl chloride (PVC), polytetrafluoroethylene (PTFE), and polyvinylidene fluoride (PVDF); as well as ethylene propylene rubber, and Viton.

Containers must allow venting of oxygen produced by decomposition over time, otherwise they may burst.

Reactions with other common products
Mixing bleach with some household cleaners can be hazardous.

Sodium hypochlorite solutions, such as liquid bleach, will release toxic chlorine gas when mixed with an acid, such as hydrochloric acid or vinegar.

A 2008 study indicated that sodium hypochlorite and organic chemicals (e.g., surfactants, fragrances) contained in several household cleaning products can react to generate chlorinated volatile organic compounds (VOCs). These chlorinated compounds are emitted during cleaning applications, some of which are toxic and probable human carcinogens. The study showed that indoor air concentrations significantly increase (8–52 times for chloroform and 1–1170 times for carbon tetrachloride, respectively, above baseline quantities in the household) during the use of bleach containing products. The increase in chlorinated volatile organic compound concentrations was the lowest for plain bleach and the highest for the products in the form of "thick liquid and gel." The significant increases observed in indoor air concentrations of several chlorinated VOCs (especially carbon tetrachloride and chloroform) indicate that the bleach use may be a source that could be important in terms of inhalation exposure to these compounds. The authors suggested that using these cleaning products may significantly increase the cancer risk.

In particular, mixing hypochlorite bleaches with amines (for example, cleaning products that contain or release ammonia, ammonium salts, urea, or related compounds and biological materials such as urine) produces chloramines. These gaseous products can cause acute lung injury. Chronic exposure, for example, from the air at swimming pools where chlorine is used as the disinfectant, can lead to the development of atopic asthma.

Bleach can react violently with hydrogen peroxide and produce oxygen gas:
H2O2 (aq) + NaOCl (aq) → NaCl (aq) + H2O (aq) + O2 (g)

Explosive reactions or byproducts can also occur in industrial and laboratory settings when sodium hypochlorite is mixed with diverse organic compounds.

Limitations in health care
The UK's National Institute for Health and Care Excellence in October 2008 recommended that Dakin's solution should not be used in routine wound care.

Environmental impact
In spite of its strong biocidal action, sodium hypochlorite per se has limited environmental impact, since the hypochlorite ion rapidly degrades before it can be absorbed by living beings.

However, one major concern arising from sodium hypochlorite use is that it tends to form persistent chlorinated organic compounds, including known carcinogens, that can be absorbed by organisms and enter the food chain. These compounds may be formed during household storage and use as well during industrial use. For example, when household bleach and wastewater were mixed, 1–2% of the available chlorine was observed to form organic compounds. As of 1994, not all the byproducts had been identified, but identified compounds include chloroform and carbon tetrachloride. The exposure to these chemicals from use is estimated to be within occupational exposure limits.

See also 
 Calcium hypochlorite  ("bleaching powder")
 Potassium hypochlorite  (the original "Javel water")
 Lithium hypochlorite 
 Sodium hypochlorite washes
 Mixed oxidant

References

Bibliography

External links 
 International Chemical Safety Card 0482 (solutions<10% active Cl)
 International Chemical Safety Card 1119 (solutions >10% active Cl)
 Institut national de recherche et de sécurité (in French)
 Home and Leisure Accident Statistics 2002 (UK RoSPA)
 Emergency Disinfection of Drinking Water (United States Environmental Protection Agency)
 Chlorinated Drinking Water (IARC Monograph)
 NTP Study Report TR-392: Chlorinated & Chloraminated Water (US NIH)
 Guidelines for the Use of Chlorine Bleach as a Sanitizer in Food Processing Operations (Oklahoma State University)

Antiseptics
Bleaches
Disinfectants
Hypochlorites
Oxidizing agents
Sodium compounds